The 1998 Brazilian Grand Prix was a Formula One motor race held at Interlagos on 29 March 1998. It was the second race of the 1998 FIA Formula One World Championship.  Mika Häkkinen, driving a McLaren-Mercedes, took pole position, set the fastest lap and led every lap on his way to victory in the 72-lap race. Teammate David Coulthard finished second, with Michael Schumacher third in a Ferrari.

Report

Background
Before the race there was a furore surrounding McLaren as Ferrari had protested about its braking system, which enabled the drivers to apply the brakes on the rear wheels independently, and thus assist both turn into corners and traction out of them. This effectively meant that the system was a four-wheel steering device, which was banned by the FIA. McLaren announced that they would not appeal the decision. Drivers including Jacques Villeneuve and Damon Hill disliked how the device performed. As a result of Ferrari's protest, the team agreed not to use the system at any stage over the weekend. However, team boss Ron Dennis was livid that the system had been approved on four occasions by the FIA technical delegate, Charlie Whiting, but was being declared illegal by the three stewards in office for the Brazilian Grand Prix.

Race
As soon as the race started, Mika Häkkinen took the lead, and he subsequently led every lap of the Grand Prix. At the back of the grid the Arrows team had their worst weekend since Tom Walkinshaw took over with Mika Salo qualifying 20th, and Pedro Diniz qualifying last. On lap one Häkkinen led David Coulthard by over a second, and was three seconds ahead of Heinz-Harald Frentzen in third. Ralf Schumacher spun out on the first lap at the fourth corner, meaning that he had not finished a single lap so far in the season. Eddie Irvine was ahead of the slow-starting Michael Schumacher. On lap 18 Coulthard was 5 seconds behind Häkkinen. Frentzen and Schumacher, after getting past his teammate, were 23 seconds behind the McLaren duo. Schumacher passed Frentzen at the first pit stop, but had to fight to make sure he was not lapped by the two McLarens. The McLarens were totally dominant, for the second time in as many races. Ferrari and Benetton could not compete with them, while reigning World Constructors' Champion Williams were also struggling. Damon Hill was disqualified following the race as his car did not meet the minimum weight requirements.

Classification

Qualifying

Race

Championship standings after the race

Drivers' Championship standings

Constructors' Championship standings

References

Brazilian Grand Prix
Brazilian Grand Prix
Grand Prix
Brazilian Grand Prix